Greetings from Fukushima (also known as Fukushima, mon Amour) is a 2016 German drama film directed by Doris Dörrie. It has been selected to be shown in the Panorama section at the 66th Berlin International Film Festival.

Cast
 Rosalie Thomass as Marie
 Kaori Momoi as Satomi
 Aya Irizuki
 Nami Kamata as Nami
 Naomi Kamara
 Moshe Cohen as Moshe
 Thomas Lettow as Jonas

References

External links
 

2016 films
2016 drama films
German drama films
2010s German-language films
2010s German films